Rushan is a given name and surname. Notable people with the name include:

Rushan Abbas, Uyghur American activist
Rushan Khasanov (born 1956), Russian football player
Rushan Rafikov (born 1995), Russian ice hockey player
Andre Rand (born Frank Rushan in 1944), American criminal